Serdal Kül (born 26 November 1987) is a Turkish football midfielder, who currently plays for FC St. Gallen in the Swiss Super League.

References
 

1987 births
Living people
Turkish footballers
FC St. Gallen players
Association football midfielders